Gerrit Jacob Roos (21 August 189810 May 1969) was a Dutch weightlifter. He competed at the 1928 Summer Olympics in the lightweight category (under 67.5kg), and finished in 14th place.

References

1898 births
1969 deaths
Olympic weightlifters of the Netherlands
Sportspeople from Amsterdam
Weightlifters at the 1928 Summer Olympics
Dutch male weightlifters
20th-century Dutch people